Enzo Biliotti (28 June 1887 – 19 November 1976) was an Italian film actor. He appeared in 80 films between 1916 and 1958. He was born in Livorno, Italy and died in Bologna, Italy.

Selected filmography

 The Betrothed (1923)
 Villafranca (1934)
 Lady of Paradise (1934)
 I Love You Only (1935)
 Bayonet (1936)
 The Ambassador (1936)
 The Two Sergeants (1936)
 Doctor Antonio (1937)
 For Men Only (1938)
 I Want to Live with Letizia (1938)
 Piccolo mondo antico (1939)
 Defendant, Stand Up! (1939)
 Backstage (1939)
 Lo vedi come sei... lo vedi come sei? (1939)
 Big Shoes (1940)
 The Pirate's Dream (1940)
 Non me lo dire! (1940)
 Two on a Vacation (1940)
 Piccolo mondo antico (1941)
 Light in the Darkness (1941)
 The Betrothed (1941)
 Don Cesare di Bazan (1942)
 The Countess of Castiglione (1942)
 Malombra (1942)
 Short Circuit (1943)
 Two Hearts Among the Beasts (1943)
 In High Places (1943)
 The Innocent Casimiro (1945)
 Un giorno nella vita (1946)
 Difficult Years (1948)
 Toto Looks for a House (1949) 
 Hawk of the Nile (1950)
 Hearts at Sea (1950)
 The Elusive Twelve (1950)
 That Ghost of My Husband (1950)
 The Knight Has Arrived! (1950)
 I'm the Hero (1952)
 Immortal Melodies (1952)
 Lieutenant Giorgio (1952)
 The Blind Woman of Sorrento (1952)
 Frine, Courtesan of Orient (1953)
 The Daughter of the Regiment (1953)
 Papà Pacifico (1954)
 Mata Hari's Daughter (1954)

References

External links

1887 births
1976 deaths
Italian male film actors
Italian male silent film actors
People from Livorno
20th-century Italian male actors